Yuliya Chumachenko or Yuliia Chumachenko (born  2 October 1994) is a Ukrainian athlete who specialises in the high jump. She has qualified for 2016 Summer Olympics.

Personal bests

Outdoor

Indoor

References

External links 
 

1994 births
Living people
Sportspeople from Mykolaiv
Ukrainian female high jumpers
Athletes (track and field) at the 2016 Summer Olympics
Olympic athletes of Ukraine
Universiade gold medalists in athletics (track and field)
Universiade gold medalists for Ukraine
Medalists at the 2019 Summer Universiade
21st-century Ukrainian women